The Claxton Enterprise is a weekly newspaper located in Claxton, Georgia, USA. It primarily serves Evans County, Georgia. The Enterprise was established in 1912 with its first issue being published on December 4, 1912.

The current executive editor is Sarah Tarr, and its publisher is Mitchell Peace.

Further reading

References

External links 
www.claxtonenterprise.com -- Official web site
Georgia Press Association Active Members

Newspapers published in Georgia (U.S. state)
Evans County, Georgia
Newspapers established in 1912
1912 establishments in Georgia (U.S. state)